KGCW (channel 26) is a television station licensed to Burlington, Iowa, United States, serving the Quad Cities area with programming from The CW. It is owned and operated by network majority owner Nexstar Media Group alongside Rock Island, Illinois–licensed CBS affiliate WHBF-TV (channel 4); Nexstar also provides certain services to Davenport, Iowa–licensed Fox affiliate KLJB (channel 18) under a shared services agreement (SSA) with Mission Broadcasting. The stations share studios in the Telco Building on 18th Street in downtown Rock Island, while KGCW's transmitter is located near Orion, Illinois.

Channel 26 began broadcasting as KJMH, a local station for Burlington, in January 1988 and became a Fox affiliate that July. It was owned by local businessman Steve Hoth, who named it for his wife. In May 1994, the station lost access to Fox programming after the network moved to strip KJMH of its affiliation. It then went off the air that November.

Grant Communications acquired the station and returned it to the air on March 1, 1996, rebroadcasting KLJB-TV in Davenport. In January 2001, channel 26 was split from channel 18 to become the affiliate of The WB in the Quad Cities, where it was seen on cable and a subchannel of KLJB, and its transmitter was relocated from Burlington to a site that offered increased coverage of the Quad Cities. The station became affiliated with The CW in 2006 when The WB and UPN merged. Nexstar acquired the Grant stations in 2014, coinciding with the separate purchase of WHBF-TV.

History

KJMH: The Hoth years
Burlington Broadcast Company, which was owned by local businessman Steve Hoth, obtained a construction permit to build a new television station in Burlington in 1984. The station went unbuilt for three years. An intended November 1987 launch was scrapped because of weather-related delays in construction. KJMH—named for JoEllen M. Hoth, Steven's wife—began broadcasting on January 5, 1988. The station, airing a mix of independent station programming and (for a time) a local newscast, represented a $1 million investment. It broadcast with an effective radiated power of 200,000 watts from a transmitting facility at Roosevelt Avenue and Winegard Drive in Burlington, sufficient only to reach the Burlington area: Mount Pleasant sat on the edge of the contour, and cities such as Keokuk and Muscatine were outside of its signal range.

Financial precarity was a major issue in the station's early history, despite becoming affiliated with Fox on July 31. In 1991, amid reports that the station's payroll checks were bouncing, the general manager resigned. Two years later, in November 1993, Fox moved to strip KJMH of its affiliation. While Hoth hired a Chicago law firm to fight the disaffiliation in court, this was unsuccessful, and KJMH ceased airing Fox programming in May 1994. The station then aired programming from home shopping service ValueVision and Channel America, which had historically catered to low-power stations.

In November 1994, Hoth announced the sale of 80 percent of the station to Kelley Broadcasting for $405,000; Kelley, a consortium of investors based in Texas, planned to affiliate KJMH with the forthcoming UPN network. Additionally, it was announced that the station would leave the air for four weeks for equipment installation and refurbishing Channel 26 did not return after the four-week period of silence, and financial questions continued to swirl. In February 1995, the law firm that had been hired to fight KJMH's disaffiliation sued for nonpayment. Hoth would later file bankruptcy for Burlington Broadcasting and a related company in October 1996; the then-former licensee of the station owed more than $444,000 against $38,000 in assets.

Grant Broadcasting ownership
The Kelley sale was never filed with the FCC; instead, in March 1995, Grant Broadcasting filed to purchase KJMH from Hoth for $400,000. The station was restored to service on March 1, 1996, as a full-time rebroadcaster of Grant-owned KLJB-TV, the Fox affiliate in Davenport.

Grant Broadcasting intended to eventually air separate programming on the station from the start. KLJB-TV had previously acquired the rights to programming from The WB in the Quad Cities market in September 1999 as a result of Superstation WGN ceasing carriage of WB programming nationally; selected WB shows aired in late night time slots on channel 18. In January 2001, The WB programming moved from a secondary affiliation on KLJB–KJMH to channel 26 alone, which was added to Quad Cities cable systems and changed its call sign to KGWB-TV. Initially, KGWB-TV broadcast its own programming for half of the broadcast day, continuing to air KLJB-TV's programming in other time slots.

While branded as channel 26, the Burlington signal was so far from the Quad Cities that another station was allowed to operate on the channel: low-power WBQD-LP debuted in 2002 as the area's UPN affiliate. KGWB-TV programming was made available over-the-air in the Quad Cities as early as 2003 as a subchannel on KLJB-TV's digital signal. After splitting channel 26's programming, Grant invested in a relocation of the KGWB-TV transmitter facility from Burlington to Seaton, Illinois, midway between Burlington and the Quad Cities, to increase the station's availability in the more populous Quad Cities area.

KGWB-TV became the local affiliate of The CW upon the merger of The WB and UPN in 2006 under new KGCW-TV call letters.

Nexstar ownership
Grant Broadcasting announced the sale of its stations for $87.5 million to Nexstar Broadcasting Group in November 2013. It was the second acquisition by Nexstar involving a Quad Cities-market television station in six weeks; in September, Nexstar had announced the acquisition of WHBF-TV in Rock Island, Illinois. The Grant purchase closed in December 2014, along with the acquisition of KLJB by Marshall Broadcasting Group under a deal in which Nexstar continued to provide services via a shared services agreement; Nexstar could own WHBF-TV with KGCW outright but not with KLJB because it was one of the top four-rated stations in the market. In May 2015, KGCW's Quad Cities simulcast—still needed to serve some viewers who could not receive a strong signal from Seaton—moved from a subchannel of KLJB to a subchannel of WHBF-TV as a consequence of the ownership change, a move that had been anticipated for months. Another effect was that KLJB and KGCW could no longer share syndicated programming.

In 2020, KGCW moved its transmitter to a new tower at Orion, from where other Quad Cities stations are broadcast. As a result, the WHBF-TV subchannel simulcast was discontinued.

Technical information

Subchannels
The station's digital signal is multiplexed:

Analog-to-digital conversion
KGCW was the only Quad Cities-market station to cease analog broadcasts on February 17, 2009, the original date in which full-power television stations in the United States were to transition from analog to digital broadcasts under federal mandate. The station's digital signal remained on its pre-transition UHF channel 41, using virtual channel 26.

References

External links

KGCW-DT2 website

Television channels and stations established in 1988
The CW affiliates
This TV affiliates
Laff (TV network) affiliates
Television stations in the Quad Cities
Burlington, Iowa
Nexstar Media Group
1988 establishments in Iowa